African American Texans or Black Texans are residents of the state of Texas who are of African ancestry and people that have origins as African-American slaves. African Americans formed a unique ethnic identity in Texas while facing the problems of societal and institutional discrimination as well as colorism for many years. The first person of African heritage to arrive in Texas was Estevanico, who came to Texas in 1528.

The earliest black residents in Texas were Afro-Mexican slaves brought by the Spanish.

A large majority of Black Texans live in the Houston, Dallas-Fort Worth and San Antonio metropolitan areas.

Texas has the largest African American population in the United States.

History 

In 1529, a Moroccan Muslim man named Estevanico became the first African to come to Texas. He was from Morocco, and was sold into slavery to a Spanish explorer. Arriving in the New World, Estevanico and the rest of his party (including Cabeza de Vaca) were shipwrecked near Galveston Island, captured by a group of Coahuiltecan Native Americans, escaped, and trekked across what is now Texas and northern Mexico. He was killed later while traveling to the state of New Mexico.

The first Africans that lived in Texas were Afro-Mexicans when Texas was still a part of Mexico before the Mexican–American War. African slaves arrived in 1528 in Spanish Texas. In 1792, there were 34 blacks and 414 mulattos in Spanish Texas. Anglo white immigration into Mexican Texas in the 1820s brought an increased numbers of slaves.

African Americans are the racial minority in Texas. Their proportion of the population has declined since the early 20th century after many left the state in the Great Migration. Blacks of both Hispanic and non-Hispanic origin made up 11.5 percent of the population in 2015; blacks of non-Hispanic origin formed 11.3 percent of the populace. African Americans of both Hispanic and non-Hispanic origin numbered roughly 2.7 million individuals, increasing in 2018 to 3,908,287. The majority of the Black and African American population of Texas lives in the Greater Houston, Dallas and San Antonio metropolitan areas.

Population 
Many African Americans in Texas remained in slavery until after the U.S. Civil War ended. There was scarce Union Army activity in Texas, preventing them from joining the Northern Army. Some escaped over the borders to areas where the Union Army was operating. The announcement of emancipation was delayed until June 19, 1865, when officials announced that slavery had been formally abolished. It was celebrated first in Texas as Juneteenth. Juneteenth was celebrated in many African American Communities throughout the United States, it was not until 156 years later in 2021, it became a Federally Nationally recognized Holiday. African Americans left Texas by the tens of thousands during the Great Migration in the first half of the 20th century, seeking work and political opportunities elsewhere. As of the 2010 U.S. Census, African Americans were 11.9% of the state's population. The long-term effects of slavery can be seen to be present in the state's demographics. The eastern quarter of the state, where cotton production depended on thousands of slaves, is the westernmost extension of the Deep South and contains a very significant number of Texas' African-American population.

Texas has one of the largest African-American populations in the country. African Americans are concentrated in northern, eastern and east-central Texas as well as the Houston, Dallas-Fort Worth and San Antonio metropolitan areas. 
African Americans form 24 percent of both the cities of Dallas and Houston, 19% of Fort Worth, 8.1 percent of Austin, and 7.5 percent of San Antonio. The African American population in Texas is increasing due to the New Great Migration. In addition to the descendants of the state's former slave population, many African American college graduates have come to the state for work recently in the New Great Migration.

A 2014 University of Texas at Austin study observed that the state's capital city of Austin was the only U.S. city with a high growth rate that was nevertheless losing African Americans, due to suburbanization and gentrification.

In 2018, African-Americans had the second highest net growth in population in Texas compared to 2010. Harris County accounted for the largest percentage of that growth. Harris County's largest city Houston is now known as a center of African-American political power, education, economic prosperity, and culture, often called the next black mecca.

There is a black Louisiana Creole community in Texas.

Historically black colleges and universities in Texas 
There are nine historically black colleges and universities (HBCUs) in Texas. Texas Southern University (largest) and Prairie View A&M University (second largest) are the two most notable HBCUs in Texas and annually produce a significant portion of college degreed African-American in the state. The schools are also major SWAC sports rivals. St. Philip's College is a public community college located in San Antonio, accredited by the Southern Association of Colleges and Schools. It is the westernmost HBCU in the United States.

Notable Black Texans

Beyoncé
Forest Whitaker
Jamie Foxx
Lecrae
Travis Scott
Ciara
Megan Thee Stallion
Lizzo
Bessie Coleman
Debbie Allen
Doris Miller
Mel Waiters
Mickey Leland
Juanita Craft
Etta Barnett
J. Mason Brewer
Rube Foster
Barbara Jordan
Yella Beezy
Phylicia Rashad

See also

 History of African Americans in Austin
 History of African Americans in Houston
 History of African Americans in Dallas–Fort Worth
 History of African Americans in San Antonio
 History of Nigerian Americans in Dallas–Fort Worth
 German Texan
 History of Mexican Americans in Texas
 Jewish history in Texas
 Estevanico
 Juneteenth
 Sweatt v. Painter
 Ivy Taylor
 J. California Cooper
 Barbara Jordan
 Joe Lockridge
 Ntozake Shange
 Afro-Mexicans
 Spanish Texas
 History of slavery in Texas
 Demographics of Texas
 Hispanics and Latinos in Texas
 African Americans in Oklahoma
 African Americans in Louisiana
 African Americans in Arkansas
List of African-American historic places in Texas
List of African-American newspapers in Texas
Black Southerners
White Americans in Texas
Native Americans in Texas

References

Further reading
 Barr, Alwyn. The African Texans.
  - Article 13
 Tang, Eric and Chunhui Ren. "Outlier: The Case of Austin's Declining African-American Population" University of Texas at Austin. May 8, 2014. Archive of old URL.
 
Black Texans: A History of African Americans in Texas, 1528-1995
The African American Experience in Texas: An Anthology
African Americans in Central Texas History: From Slavery to Civil Rights

External links
 "African Americans." Handbook of Texas.
 Blacks in Colonial Spanish Texas
 Afro-Mexicans: The History, The Culture, The Presence
 African Presence in Texas

 
African Americans